Rex Hedrick (born 1 November 1988 in Melbourne) is a professional squash player who represents Australia. He reached a career-high world ranking of World No. 48 in September 2018.

References

External links 
 
 
 

Australian male squash players
Living people
1988 births
Squash players at the 2018 Commonwealth Games
Commonwealth Games competitors for Australia
20th-century Australian people
21st-century Australian people